Iván Fund was born in San Cristóbal, Argentina in 1984. He grew up in Crespo, Entre
Ríos, where he graduated from high school. In 2002, he moved to Buenos Aires and worked as a cinematographer.
In 2005 he directed his first short film, Vals, which was honored with a special mention
from the Jury at the Mar del Plata International Film Festival. In 2006 he directed the short films
Sirenas and El Baile, and received, among other awards, a Georges Meliés Short Film Prize, awarded
by Alliance Française. In 2007, he directed the short films Divergir and Un Punto Fijo, as well as the
short feature Cicope, which he directed in collaboration with Patricio Toscano and which was a BAFICI
Official Selection. In 2008, he began collaborating with Santiago Loza. In 2009, his first feature film, La
Risa, was a BAFICI Official Selection.

His film Los Labios won the Cannes Film Festival Un Certain Regard Award for Best Actress in 2010.

References

External links

Argentine film directors
Living people
1984 births